Staghorn clubmoss is a common name for several plants and may refer to:

Palhinhaea cernua
Lycopodium clavatum